James (or Jim or Jamie) Mackenzie (or McKenzie) may refer to:

Sports
Jim Mackenzie (American football) (1930–1967), football coach
James McKenzie (boxer) (1903–1931), British boxer
Jim McKenzie (footballer) (1877–?), Scottish-born footballer who played for Burton Swifts and Southampton in the 1890s
Jamie McKenzie (footballer, born 1980), Scottish-born football midfielder whose clubs have included Partick Thistle and Albion Rovers
Jamie McKenzie (footballer, born 1986), Scottish-born football defender who has played for clubs in Scotland, Ireland and Cyprus
Jim McKenzie (ice hockey) (born 1969), Canadian ice hockey player whose teams included Hartford Whalers, Phoenix Coyotes and New Jersey Devils
James MacKenzie (rugby union) (1886–1963), Scottish international rugby union player

Other people
James MacKenzie (VC) (1889–1914), Scottish recipient of the Victoria Cross
Sir James Mackenzie (cardiologist) (1853–1925), Scottish cardiologist
James A. McKenzie (1840–1904), U.S. Representative from Kentucky
James A. McKenzie (Wisconsin politician), American businessman and politician
James Mckenzie (outlaw) (1820–?), Scottish-born New Zealand outlaw
James Mackenzie (actor) (born 1979), Scottish actor who presents the children's game show Raven
James McKenzie (Manitoba politician) (1854–1936), politician in Manitoba, Canada
James McKenzie (Australian politician) (1867–1939)
James Cameron Mackenzie (1852–1931), American educator
James Hewat McKenzie (1869–1929), British parapsychologist
Kenzie (James MacKenzie, born 1986), British rapper
James Hutton Mackenzie (1849–1949), New Zealand Presbyterian minister
James Stuart-Mackenzie (c. 1719–1800), Scottish politician
James B. McKenzie (1926–2002), American theater producer
James George Mackenzie, Royal Navy officer and governor of the Falkland Islands